The following is a list of films produced in the Kannada film industry in India in 1994, presented in alphabetical order.

References

External links
 http://www.bharatmovies.com/kannada/info/moviepages.htm
 http://www.kannadastore.com/

See also 

 Kannada films of 1993
 Kannada films of 1995

1994
Lists of 1994 films by country or language
1994 films
1994 in Indian cinema